Urbana Township is a township in Monroe County, Iowa, USA.

History 
Urbana Township was first settled in 1844.

References 

Townships in Monroe County, Iowa
Townships in Iowa